Donald Roy Simensen (September 11, 1926 – April 22, 1994) was an American football offensive tackle who played two seasons with the Los Angeles Rams of the National Football League. He played college football at the University of St. Thomas and attended Central High School in Saint Paul, Minnesota.

References

External links
Just Sports Stats

1926 births
1994 deaths
Players of American football from North Dakota
American football offensive tackles
St. Thomas (Minnesota) Tommies football players
Los Angeles Rams players
Sportspeople from Minot, North Dakota